Jean-Édouard Desmedt (19 February 1926 in Wavre – 23 November 2009) was a Belgian scientist and professor at the Universite Libre de Bruxelles (ULB), who was awarded the Francqui Prize on Biological and Medical Sciences for his work on neurophysiology. He is a member of the Académie nationale de Médecine  in France, and the Natural Science Section of the Royal Academy of Science, Humanities and Fine Arts of Belgium.

References

1926 births
2009 deaths
Belgian scientists
Desmedt, Jean-Edouard
Desmedt, Jean-Edouard